Saunook is an unincorporated community in Haywood County, North Carolina, United States. Saunook is located along US 74, west of Waynesville and east of Balsam.

History
Prior to European colonization, the area that is now Saunook was inhabited by the Cherokee people and other Indigenous peoples for thousands of years. The Cherokee in Western North Carolina are known as the Eastern Band of Cherokee Indians, a federally recognized tribe.

References

External links
 USGS: Saunook
 Roadside Thoughts: Saunook, North Carolina
 

Unincorporated communities in Haywood County, North Carolina
Unincorporated communities in North Carolina
Communities of the Great Smoky Mountains